The Großer Rettenstein is a mountain with multiple peaks in the Kitzbühel Alps in Austria. The main summit reaches a height of  
Although not the highest mountain in the Kitzbühel Alps (that honour goes to the Kreuzjoch at ), the Großer Rettenstein is the most striking in this range of otherwise gentle grass-covered mountains. It also has a mighty, craggy, summit block made of limestone, four hundred metres high, that stands atop base of grauwacke and primary rock (Urgestein - quartz phyllite). The Rettenstein is the dominating peak of the  Spertental valley. Its isolated location also makes the summit an outstanding viewing point and it is therefore a popular destination. To the north the Rettenstein sends a long ridge out to the Spiessnägel, that separates the oberer Grund and unterer Grund.

Nature 
The Rettenstein lies in the Spertental-Rettenstein protected landscape and so Pine, Spruce, Gentian, Willow Gentian, Platenigl, Edelweiss, Monkshood, Rock Ptarmigan, Black Grouse and Capercaillie, Red Deer, Chamois, Ibex and Marmot all occur here.

Tour options 
The simplest ascent starts from Aschau in the Sperten valley and crosses the unterer Grund and the Schöntalalm in 3 to 4 hours. Sure-footedness is required for this route. As a variation on the descent, fit hikers can take the long ridgeway over the Spiessnägel.

Another approach option is possible from the Mühlbach valley (Bramberg municipality) in the upper Pinzgau to the south. Here the way runs initially along a drivable forest track (close to the public) through the Baumgartenalm almost as far as the Stangenjoch.

Gallery

External links 
 Tour description and map 
 Mountaineering on the Großer Rettenstein 
 weitere Tour description and photographs 
 Information about the protected landscape with interactive map 

Mountains of the Alps
Mountains of Tyrol (state)
Mountains of Salzburg (state)
Two-thousanders of Austria
Kitzbühel Alps
Kitzbühel District